Rahelty, sometimes written Rahealty, is a townland in the civil parish of the same name in County Tipperary, Ireland.

References

Townlands of County Tipperary